This page lists the World Best Year Performances in the year 1984 in the Men's hammer throw. One of the main events during this season were the 1984 Summer Olympics in Los Angeles, California (USA), where the final of the men's competition was held on August 6, 1984. Women did not compete in the hammer throw until the early 1990s. Soviet Union's Yuriy Sedykh broke the world record during the 1984 season.

Records

1984 World Year Ranking

References
apulanta
hammerthrow.wz

1984
Hammer Throw Year Ranking, 1984